Server-Sent Events (SSE) is a server push technology enabling a client to receive automatic updates from a server via an HTTP connection, and describes how servers can initiate data transmission towards clients once an initial client connection has been established. They are commonly used to send message updates or continuous data streams to a browser client and designed to enhance native, cross-browser streaming through a JavaScript API called EventSource, through which a client requests a particular URL in order to receive an event stream. The EventSource API is standardized as part of HTML5 by the WHATWG.  The media type for SSE is text/event-stream.

History 
The SSE mechanism was first specified by Ian Hickson as part of the "WHATWG Web Applications 1.0" proposal starting in 2004. In September 2006, the Opera web browser implemented the experimental technology in a feature called "Server-Sent Events".

Browser support 
All modern browsers support server-sent events: Firefox 6+, Google Chrome 6+, Opera 11.5+, Safari 5+, Microsoft Edge 79+.

Libraries

.NET
 Service Stack EventSource library with both server and client implementations.

ASP.NET
 SignalR - Transparent implementation for ASP.NET.

C
 HaSSEs Asynchronous server-side SSE daemon written in C (It uses one thread for all connected clients).

Erlang
 Lasse EventSource server handler for Erlang's cowboy
 Shotgun EventSource client in Erlang

Go
 eventsource EventSource library for Go.
 go-sse SSE implementation for Go.
 sse SSE with optimized decoder for Go
 gosse Server-sided implementation with channel concept and further features for out-of-the-box use.
 sse Server Sent Events server and client for Golang

Java
 Javalin - lightweight Java and Kotlin web framework
 jEaSSE - Server-side asynchronous implementation for Java servlets and Vert.x
 Akka HTTP has SSE support since version 10.0.8
 alpakka Event Source Connector EventSource library for alpakka which supports reconnection
 Spring WebFlux Server and client side Java implementation built on reactive streams and non-blocking servers
 Jersey has a full implementation of JAX-RS support for Server Sent Events as defined in JSR-370
 Micronaut HTTP server supports emitting Server Sent Events
 JeSSE  - Server-side library with user/session management, group broadcast, and authentication
 Armeria has server and client-side asynchronous SSE implementation built on top of Netty and Reactive Streams
 Play Framework Event Source for server-sent event emission
 SSE Client SSE Client library

Node.js
 sse-stream - Node.js/Browserify implementation (client and server).
 total.js - web application framework for Node.js - example + supports WebSockets (RFC 6455)
 eventsource-node - EventSource client for Node.js
 Thread-SSE - A library for Node.js and web browser to develop security and high-performance SSE.

Objective C
 TRVSEventSource - EventSource implementation in Objective-C for iOS and macOS using NSURLSession.

Perl
 Mojolicious - Perl real-time web framework.

PHP
 Hoa\Eventsource - Server implementation.

Python
 Python SSE Client - EventSource client library for Python using Requests library.
 Server Side Events (SSE) client for Python - EventSource client library for Python using Requests or urllib3 library.
 django-eventstream - Server-Sent Events for Django.
 flask-sse - A simple Flask extension powered by Redis.
 sse
 SSE protocol for Starlette - Server sent events for starlette and FastApi.
 event-source-library - Implementation in python2 with Tornado. Client and server implementations.
 aiohttp-sse - Server-sent events support for aiohttp.
 SSE Package - Modern EventSource library written in Python3.10.

Ruby
 Faye - Simple pub/sub messaging for the web.
 Iodine - HTTP, WebSockets and EventSource (SSE) and Native Pub/Sub.

Rust
 hyper A low-level HTTP library.
 Warp A web server framework.

Scala
 Akka HTTP has SSE support since version 10.0.8
 alpakka Event Source Connector EventSource library for alpakka which supports reconnection

Swift
 EventSource - EventSource implementation using NSURLSession.

See also

Chunked transfer encoding
Push technology
Comet

References

External links
Server-Sent Events. HTML Living Standard.
HTML5 Server-push Technologies, Part 1. Introduction into HTML5 Server-push Technologies. Part 1 covers ServerSent Events.
Using Server-Sent Events. A concise example of how to use server-sent events, on the Mozilla Developer Network.
EventSource reference on MDN
Django push: Using Server-Sent Events and WebSocket with Django Django push: Using Server-Sent Events and WebSocket with Django.
Server-Sent Events vs WebSockets

HTML5
Internet terminology
Push technology
Web development